John Kerr (August 4, 1782 – September 29, 1842) was a member of the U.S. House of Representatives representing Virginia from March 4, 1813, to March 3, 1815, and again from October 30, 1815, to March 3, 1817.

He was the father of John Kerr, Jr., cousin of Bartlett Yancey, and grand-uncle of John H. Kerr. A native of the Yanceyville, North Carolina area, Kerr was licensed as a Baptist minister in 1802 and moved to Halifax County, Virginia in 1805; he later lived in Pittsylvania County, Virginia as well.

References

External links

Settle-Kerr family of North Carolina

1782 births
1842 deaths
Baptists from Virginia
Democratic-Republican Party members of the United States House of Representatives from Virginia
19th-century American politicians
People from Yanceyville, North Carolina
People from Halifax County, Virginia
Baptists from North Carolina
19th-century Baptist ministers from the United States